Liao Lei (born 1 March 1999) is a Chinese footballer currently playing as a left-back for Shenzhen.

Career statistics

Club
.

References

1999 births
Living people
Footballers from Sichuan
Chinese footballers
Association football defenders
Tercera División players
China League Two players
China League One players
Shandong Taishan F.C. players
FC Jumilla players
Shenzhen F.C. players
Beijing Sport University F.C. players
Chinese expatriate footballers
Chinese expatriate sportspeople in Spain
Expatriate footballers in Spain